Arya Putra Gerryan Senyiur Lawolo (born October 24, 2001) is an Indonesian professional footballer who plays as a winger for Liga 1 club Borneo.

Club career

Borneo
Arya signed with Borneo to play in the Indonesian Liga 1 for the 2020 season. This season was suspended on 27 March 2020 due to the COVID-19 pandemic. The season was abandoned and was declared void on 20 January 2021.

Persijap Jepara (loan)
In 2021, Arya signed a contract with Indonesian Liga 2 club Persijap Jepara. He made his league debut on 16 November 2021 in a match against PSG Pati at the Manahan Stadium, Surakarta.

Persiraja Banda Aceh (loan)
In 2021, Arya signed a contract with Indonesian Liga 1 club Persiraja Banda Aceh, on loan from Borneo. He made his league debut on 16 January 2022 in a match against Persipura Jayapura at the Kompyang Sujana Stadium, Denpasar.

Career statistics

Club

Notes

References

External links
 Arya Gerryan at Soccerway
 Arya Gerryan at Liga Indonesia

2001 births
Living people
Indonesian footballers
Liga 1 (Indonesia) players
Liga 2 (Indonesia) players
Borneo F.C. players
Persijap Jepara players
Persiraja Banda Aceh players
Association football midfielders
People from Samarinda
Sportspeople from East Kalimantan